Shadini Zehi (also Romanized as Shādīnī Zehī; also known as Shādenīzey, Shādīn Zehī, and Shād Nīzī) is a village in Surak Rural District, Lirdaf District, Jask County, Hormozgan Province, Iran. At the 2006 census, its population was 25, in 6 families.

References 

Populated places in Jask County